Antonín Brych was a Czech sports shooter. He competed for Czechoslovakia in six events at the 1920 Summer Olympics.

References

External links
 
 

Year of birth missing
Year of death missing
Czech male sport shooters
Olympic shooters of Czechoslovakia
Shooters at the 1920 Summer Olympics
Place of birth missing